Midway Station may refer to:
Midway station (Minnesota), an Amtrak train station in Saint Paul, Minnesota
Midway station (CTA), a metro station in Chicago, Illinois
Midway Station, part of the McKay-Carter Intergalactic Gate Bridge in the fictional Stargate franchise

See also
Midway (disambiguation)